Kill or Cure may refer to:

Films 

 Kill or Cure (1923 film), a film starring Stan Laurel
 Kill or Cure (1962 film), a British comedy film

Music 

 Killed or Cured, an album by The New Amsterdams